François Bailly (-1690) was a French mason, architect and official who was a prominent citizen in Montreal.

Biography 

Born in France, he came to Canada in 1659 under contract with the Abbé Queylus. He formed partnerships first with Urbain Brossard then with Michel Bouvier. His most notable work was the Notre-Dame Church (Montreal), built under the direction of François Dollier de Casson, which was on a grander scale than the Notre-Dame de Québec Cathedral in Quebec City.

Bailly also held public offices. By 1663 Bailly had joined the Sainte-Famille militia. In 1667, he was appointed a sergeant-royal and in 1676 a prison warden.

Gallery

References

 Alan Gowans, "François Bailly" Dictionary of Canadian Biography online, 2000

1630s births
1690 deaths
Canadian architects
People of New France
Year of birth uncertain